Gordon Maxfield Kerr (October 4, 1917 – March 31, 2009) was a Canadian backstroke swimmer who competed in the 1936 Summer Olympics in Berlin.  He advanced to the semi-finals of the 100-metre backstroke, but did not qualify for the final.  He finished tenth overall.

At the 1938 British Empire Games in Sydney, he won the silver medal in the 100-yard backstroke competition.  He was also a member of the Canadian team which won the silver medal in the 3×110-yard medley relay.

See also
 List of Commonwealth Games medallists in swimming (men)

References

External links

Gordon Kerr's obituary

1917 births
2009 deaths
Canadian male backstroke swimmers
Commonwealth Games medallists in swimming
Commonwealth Games silver medallists for Canada
Olympic swimmers of Canada
Sportspeople from Brantford
Swimmers at the 1936 Summer Olympics
Swimmers at the 1938 British Empire Games
Medallists at the 1938 British Empire Games